Seyyed Ali Qazi Askar (born 26 May 1954, Isfahan) is an Iranian Twelver Shia cleric who was appointed as the representative of Iran's supreme leader and the superintendent of Iranian Hujjaj (Hajis) by the decree of Seyyed Ali Khamenei; and was in action at the mentioned position for approximately 10 years (since 2009 to 2019).

By the decree of the Supreme Leader of the Islamic Republic of Iran, Seyyed Ali Khamenei, Ali Ghazi Askar was appointed as the custodian of the shrine of Abd al-Azim al-Hasani and its affiliates -- on 27 March 2022.

This Shia Ayatollah passed his education period in diverse sections in Isfahan and Qom, and received his doctoral equivalent (second period paper of "Kharej") in 1995. Qazi Askar was also appointed as the temporary Imam of Friday Prayer in Isfahan in 1998, and was active there for 5 years. He also had responsibility at the Bese (Persian: بعثه) of Seyyed Ruhollah Khomeini and Seyyed Ali Khamenei.

There have been published 16 volumes of books, and approximately 50 scientific articles; and had submitted several articles to Hajj international congress in KSA.

Works 
Amongs his compilations are:
 Al-Baqi' destruction according to documents (2)
 Tawaf and its importance in narrations
 A Research on Sha'b Abi Talib
 What is Hajj Akbar?

See also 
 List of provincial representatives appointed by Supreme Leader of Iran
 Seyyed Abdul Fattah Nawab

References 

Living people
Shia clerics from Isfahan
1954 births